Articles (arranged alphabetically) related to Ghana include:



0-9 

 1892 Sack of Salaga
 1948 Accra riots
 1992 Ghanaian constitutional referendum
 2002 Dagbon chieftaincy crisis
 2008 African Cup of Nations
 2011 National Democratic Congress presidential primaries
 2011 New Patriotic Party Primaries
 2015 Accra floods
2015 Accra explosion
 2016 Ghana bus collision
 2016 Ghanaian presidential pardon of contemnors
 2017 Atomic Junction gas explosion
 2018 Ghanaian new regions referendum
 2019 Ghanaian constitutional referendum attempt
 2019 Ghana Movie Awards
 2021 Asafo-Akyem bus crash
 2022 Bogoso explosion

A 

 Aburi Botanical Gardens
 Abutia
 Accra
 Accra Academy
 Accra Hearts of Oak Sporting Club
 Accra International Conference Center
 Accra Native Confederation
 Accra Sports Stadium disaster
 Achimota Forest
 Achimota School
 Adae Kese Festival
 Adangme language
 Adinkra
 Adom Praiz
 African Americans in Ghana
 Agbeli Kaklo
 Agbogbloshie
 Aggry beads
 Agriculture in Ghana
 Ahenema
 Akan language
 Akan names
 Akan people
 Akosombo Dam
 Akuapem dialect
 Akwamu
 Akwasidae Festival
 Akyem
 Alcan
 Aluworks
 Aluminum
 Aluminum in Africa
 American International School, Accra, Ghana
 Ampe
 Anansi
 Anas Aremeyaw Anas
 Ankasa Conservation Area
 Antrak Air
 Armed Forces Revolutionary Council, Ghana
 Asafo
 Ashanti Empire
 Ashanti Goldfields Corporation
 Ashanti Yam Festival
 Ashesi University
 Assin Manso Slave River Site
 Atebubu
 Atewa Range
 Atlantic Ocean
 Axatse
 Ayigbe biscuit

B 
 Bank of Ghana
 Batakari day
 Batakari Festival
 Bauxite
 Berekum Sports Stadium
 Bibliography of Ghana
 The Big Six (Ghana)
 Birim River
 Black Star of Africa
 Bofoakwa Tano
 Bono dialect
 Bono people
 Bono state
 British Togoland
 Bureau of National Investigations

C 

 Camelot Ghana
 Cape Coast
 Cape Coast Castle
 Cape Coast Sports Stadium
 Carranzar Naa Okailey Shooter
 Cedi
 Chale Wote Street Art Festival
 Childbirth in Ghana
 Chocolate
 Chop bar
 Christianity in Ghana
 Cinema of Ghana
 Climate change in Ghana
 Climate of Ghana
 Coat of arms of Ghana
 Cocoa
 Cocoa production in Ghana
 Company registration in Ghana
 Communications in Ghana
 Constitution of Ghana
 Convention People's Party
 Coronation Park
 Corruption in Ghana
 Council of State (Ghana)
 CTK - CiTylinK
 Culture of Ghana

D 
 Dada Boat
 Dagomba language
 Dagomba people
 Daily Graphic (Ghana)
 Dancing Pallbearers
 Danish Gold Coast
 Dansoman Park
 Demographics of Ghana
 Dipo
 Disability in Ghana
 Districts of Ghana
 Dutch Gold Coast

E 
 E-levy (Ghana)
 Early history of Ghana
 Eastern Music Awards
 Economy of Ghana
 Education in Ghana
 Ejura shooting
 Elections in Ghana
 Electoral Commission of Ghana
 Electricity sector in Ghana
 Elmina Castle
 Empire of Ghana
 Etruscan Resources
 Ewe drumming
 Ewe language
 Eye care in Ghana

F 
 Fancy Dress Festival
 Fantasy coffin
 Fante
 Fante language
 Fauna of Ghana
 Fetu Afahye
 Figurative palanquin
 Fontomfrom
 Football in Ghana
 Foreign relations of Ghana
 Forestry in Ghana
 Fort Nassau, Ghana
 Fort Prinzenstein
 Forts and Castles, Volta, Greater Accra, Central and Western Regions
 Founder's Day (Ghana)

G 

 Ga language
 Ga people
 Gbewaa Palace
 Genetically modified food in Ghana
 Geography of Ghana
 Geology of Ghana
 Ghana
 Ghana Academy of Arts and Sciences
 Ghana Academy of Film and Television Arts
 Ghana Air Force
 Ghana Airways
 Ghana Armed Forces
 Ghana Army
 Ghana at the FIFA Women's World Cup
 Ghana at the FIFA World Cup
 Ghana Atomic Energy Commission
 Ghana Bar Association
 Ghana Broadcasting Corporation
 Ghana Chamber of Telecommunications
 Ghana Civil Service
 Ghana Cocoa Board
 Ghana Commercial Bank
 Ghana Economic Forum
 Ghana Federation of Labour
 Ghana Football Association
 Ghana Football Leagues
 Ghana Freedom
 Ghana Health Service
 Ghana Immigration Service
 Ghana Independence Act 1957
 Ghana Innovation Marketplace
 Ghana Institute of Journalism
 Ghana Institute of Management and Public Administration
 Ghana International Airlines
 Ghana Journalists Association
 Ghana Military Academy
 Ghana National Agricultural Export
 Ghana national cricket team
 Ghana National Fire Service
 Ghana national football team
 Ghana National Gas Company
 Ghana National Petroleum Corporation
 Ghana Navy
 Ghana News Agency
 Ghana Oil Company
 Ghana Optometric Association
 Ghana Ports and Harbours Authority
 Ghana Post
 Ghana Railway Corporation
 Ghana Regiment
 Ghana Road Network
 Ghana School of Law
 Ghana Standards Board
 Ghana Stock Exchange
 Ghana Telecom University College
 Ghana–United States relations
 Ghana Water Company Limited
 Ghana women's national football team results
 Ghanaian cuisine
 Ghanaian people
 Gmayem festival
 God Bless Our Homeland Ghana (national anthem)
 Gold Coast ackey
 Gold Coast (British colony)
 Gold Coast Influenza Epidemic
 Gold Coast in World War II
 Gold Coast (region)
 Gold Coast Aborigines' Rights Protection Society
 Golden Jubilee House
 Golden Stool
 Gologo festival
 Gonja language
 Gonja people
 Government of Ghana
 GSE All-Share Index
 GTV

H 
 Health Improvement and Promotion Alliance
 Health in Ghana
 Hinduism in Ghana
 History of Elmina
 History of Ghana
 History of Ghana (1966–79)
 Homowo

I 
 Illegal immigration to Ghana
 Immigration to Ghana
 Independence Arch (Accra)
 Institute of African Studies
 International rankings of Ghana
 Islam in Ghana
 Investigative works of Anas Aremeyaw Anas

J 
 Jenini
 John Canoe
 Johnsons Air
 Jollof derby
 Joy FM (Ghana)
 Josephine Oppong Yeboah
 Judiciary of Ghana

K 
 Kakum National Park
 Kintampo
 Kintampo archeological site
 Kintampo District
 Kintampo South District
 Kintampo North District
 Kintampo waterfalls
 Kofi Annan International Peacekeeping Training Centre
 Koforidua
 Komfo Anokye Teaching Hospital
 Korle Bu Teaching Hospital
 Kotoka International Airport
 Kpalikpakpaza
 Kpanlogo
 Kube Cake
 Kumasi Academy
 Kumasi Airport
 Kumasi Metropolitan Assembly
 Kumasi Sports Stadium
 Kusaal language
 Kwame Nkrumah Mausoleum
 Kwame Nkrumah University of Science and Technology

L 

 Labadi Beach
 Lamashegu shooting
 Languages of Ghana
 Law enforcement in Ghana
 Legon
 LGBT rights in Ghana (gay rights)
 Liberation Day Monument
 Lincoln Community School, Accra Ghana
 List of abbreviations in Ghana
 List of airlines of Ghana
 List of airports in Ghana
 List of birds of Ghana
 List of bridges in Ghana
 List of castles in Ghana
 List of cities in Ghana
 List of Colonial Heads of Ghana
 List of diplomatic missions in Ghana
 List of Ecological tourist sites in Ghana
 List of festivals in Ghana
 List of financial institutions in Ghana
 List of Ga rulers
 List of Ghana governments
 List of Ghana Parliament constituencies
 List of Ghana prisons
 List of Ghanaian actors
 List of Ghanaian companies
 List of Ghana flags
 List of Ghanaian musicians
 List of Ghanaian novelists
 List of Ghanaian poets
 List of Ghanaian politicians
 List of Ghanaian records in athletics
 List of Ghanaian records in swimming
 List of Ghanaian regional ministers
 List of Ghanaian regions by area
 List of Ghanaian regions by population
 List of Ghanaians
 List of Ghanaians in the United Kingdom
 List of Ghanaian women writers
 List of Ghanaian writers
 List of governors of the Gold Coast
 List of heads of state of Ghana
 List of historical Ghanaian traditional rulers
 List of hospitals in Ghana
 List of libraries in Ghana
 List of lighthouses in Ghana
 List of mammals of Ghana
 List of museums in Ghana
 List of national parks of Ghana
 List of newspapers in Ghana
 List of people on the postage stamps of Ghana
 List of political parties in Ghana
 List of power stations in Ghana
 List of radio stations in Ghana
 List of reptiles of Ghana
 List of rivers of Ghana
 List of road interchanges in Ghana
 List of rulers of Asante
 List of rulers of Gã (Nkran)
 Lists of rulers of Ghana
 List of rulers of the Akan state of Adanse
 List of rulers of the Akan state of Akuapem
 List of rulers of the Akan state of Akuapem Guan
 List of rulers of the Akan state of Akyem Abuakwa
 List of rulers of the Akan state of Akyem Bosume
 List of rulers of the Akan state of Akyem Kotoku
 List of rulers of the Akan state of Assin Apimenem
 List of rulers of the Akan state of Assin Atadanso
 List of rulers of the Akan state of Bono-Tekyiman
 List of rulers of the Akan state of Denkyira
 List of rulers of the Akan state of Dwaben
 List of rulers of the Akan state of Gyaaman
 List of rulers of the Akan states of Akwamu and Twifo-Heman
 List of rulers of the Ewe state of Anlo
 List of rulers of the Ewe state of Peki
 List of rulers of the Fante Confederation
 List of rulers of the Northern state of Mamprusi
 List of schools in Ghana
 List of shopping malls in Ghana
 List of universities in Ghana

M 

 Makola Market
 Mankessim Kingdom
 Manufacturing in Ghana
 Markets in Ghana
 Media of Ghana
 Mfantsipim Senior High School
 Military of Ghana
 Military of the Ashanti Empire
 Mining industry of Ghana
 MK Airlines'
 Mpre language
 MTN Hitmaker

N 
 National Archives of Ghana
 National Democratic Party (Ghana)
 National Liberation Council
 National Museum of Ghana
 National Pledge of Ghana
 National Redemption Council
 National Service Secretariat (Ghana)
 National Symphony Orchestra Ghana
 National Theatre of Ghana
 New Patriotic Party
 News Ghana
 Northerner (Ghana)
 Nuclear power in Ghana
 Number 12: When Greed and Corruption Become the Norm
 Nzema language

O 
 Odwira festival
 Oil reserves in Ghana
 Omo tuo
 Opoku Ware Senior High School
 Optometry in Ghana
 Order of the Star and Eagles of Ghana
 Order of the Star of Ghana
 Order of the Volta
 Orders, decorations, and medals of Ghana
 Osu Castle
 Outline of Ghana

P 
 Palm oil
 Palmitic acid
 Panafest
 Pan-African Orchestra
 Pan African Writers' Association
 Parliament of Ghana
 Paul Oliver v. Samuel K. Boateng
 Pearson Education Limited v Morgan Adzei
 Politics of Ghana
 Political systems of the Ashanti Empire
 Poloo
 Polygamy in Ghana
 Port Francqui incident
 Postage stamps and postal history of Ghana
 Prayer camps
 Prempeh College
 Presbyterian Boys' Senior High School
 President of Ghana
 Prime Minister of Ghana
 Progress Party (Ghana)
 Property Law in Ghana
 Public holidays in Ghana

Q 
 Dr Alex Quaison-Sackey
 Quartey

R 
 Regional hospitals of Ghana
 Regional Maritime Academy - WMU Branch
 Regions of Ghana
 Registration of Intellectual Property in Ghana
 Religion in Ghana
 Revenue stamps of the Gold Coast
 Roman Catholicism in Ghana
 Rugby union in Ghana
 Rulers of Ghana
 Rural Education and Development Programme

S 
 Salt industry in Ghana
 St. Augustine's College (Cape Coast)
 St. Barbara Catholic Church
 St. Francis Girls' Senior High School, Jirapa
 Schools in Ghana
 Scouting in Ghana
 Sekondi-Takoradi Stadium
 Shai Hills
 Shai Hills Resource Reserve
 Skin lightening in Ghana
 Smelting
 SSNIT
 Social conduct in Ghana
 Solar Wash
 Spirit children
 Spoken word in Ghana
 Sports in Ghana
 Sprite Ball Championship
 Street children in Ghana
 Suame Magazine, Kumasi
 Sunyani Airport
 Supreme Military Council (Ghana)
 Sustainable Development Goals and Ghana
 Susu collectors

T 
 Tabom people
 Tain River
 Takoradi Airport
 Tamale Airport
 Tamale Stadium
 Tano River
 Telecommunications in Ghana
 Telephone numbers in Ghana
 Tema
 Tema Development Corporation
 The Big Six (Ghana)
 Time in Ghana
 Topremang
 Tourism in Ghana
 Trade unions in Ghana
 Trades Union Congress of Ghana
 Transportation in Ghana
 Treaty of Fomena
 Twi

U 
 United Party (Ghana)
 University for Development Studies
 University of Cape Coast
 University of Education, Winneba
 University of Energy and Natural Resources
 University of Ghana
 University of Ghana Medical School
 University of Health and Allied Sciences
 University of Mines and Technology
 University of Professional Studies
 Ussher Fort
 UTAG strike 2022

V 
 Vice-President of Ghana
 Volta Aluminum Company
 Volta Region
 Volta River
 Volta River Authority

W 
 Waist beads
 War of the Golden Stool
 Water privatisation in Ghana
 Water supply and sanitation in Ghana
 W. E. B. Du Bois Memorial Centre for Pan African Culture
 Wesley College, Kumasi
 Wesley Girls' High School
 West Africa
 Whispering Rocks and Shrines of Tongo
 Women's football in Ghana

Y 
 Yaa Asantewaa
 Yaa Asantewaa Festival
 Yaa Asantewaa War

See also

 Lists of country-related topics - similar lists for other countries

 
Ghana